Peter Ian Pawlett (born 3 February 1991) is a professional footballer who plays as a midfielder for Scottish Premiership club Dundee United. He spent much of his early career at Aberdeen and has also played for St Johnstone and Milton Keynes Dons.

He has been capped for Scotland at U19 and U21 levels.

Early life
Born on 3 February 1991 in Hull, East Riding of Yorkshire but moved to Banchory, Aberdeenshire aged around 7. He grew up supporting Hull City.

Club career

Aberdeen
Pawlett was brought up in Aberdeen from a young age and made his Aberdeen debut in February 2009, coming on as a substitute in a 5–0 Scottish Cup victory over East Fife. He made his SPL debut for Aberdeen as a substitute in a 3–1 loss to Celtic on 2 May 2009, and he made his first league start in a 2–1 loss to Rangers two weeks later.

On 7 November 2009, Pawlett set up the first goal for Sone Aluko in a 2–1 win over St Johnstone. Soon after, Pawlett, along with four other players, was offered a new contract and eventually signed a four-year deal soon after During the season, in January 2010, Pawlett sustained a knee injury which required surgery. A month later it was reported that the injury would keep him out of action for the remainder of the 2009–10 season. In each of the next two seasons, Pawlett spoke out about his injury, saying he had worked for optimum fitness while undergoing rehabilitation and that he was able to move on from his injury.

Pawlett made his return at the beginning of the 2010–11 season and played his first match in a 4–0 win over Hamilton Academical at the opening game of the season. After making three more appearances during the season, Pawlett suffered a toe injury and this kept him for three months. He made his return in a 5–0 defeat to Heart of Midlothian on 11 December 2010. On 30 April 2011, Pawlett scored his first goal for Aberdeen in a 1–0 win over Inverness Caledonian Thistle.

On 20 December 2011 in a 1–0 win over Hibernian, Pawlett received a straight red card after a challenge on Lewis Stevenson. In the second half before his sending off, he fell theatrically inside the penalty box when challenged by Ivan Sproule, resulting in a penalty being given which was converted by Scott Vernon. After the game, he was given a two match suspension by the SFA. The club decided against appealing the ban.

On 23 August 2012, Pawlett joined fellow Scottish Premier League side St Johnstone on loan until January 2013. Pawlett made his debut, coming on as a substitute in a 2–0 loss against Hibernian. Pawlett went on to make nine appearances for St Johnstone and stated his desire to stay at the club for the rest of the season On 1 January, the loan spell was extended for another two games, although there was also the possibility of a permanent move. However, after the sale of fellow midfielder Ryan Fraser to Bournemouth, Aberdeen recalled the midfielder to play in their first team. After his loan spell ended, St Johnstone Manager Steve Lomas said he wasn't surprised that Aberdeen had chosen to recall Pawlett.
After being recalled from his loan with St Johnstone, he made his first appearance since leaving on loan, in a 0–0 draw against Hibernian. During the match, Pawlett created controversy when he was booked for diving, leading Craig Brown to say that if it was found he had dived, the club would take action against him. During that game, Pawlett gained more notoriety when his shorts fell down after getting tackled by Gary Deegan, revealing his underpants. a match against Dundee on 5 May 2013, Pawlett was criticised for allegedly diving to win a penalty. The penalty was converted by Niall McGinn to level the game. The match finished 1–1, but the draw wasn't enough to prevent Dundee being relegated to the First Division. After criticism of the diving, Pawlett received a two-match suspension, which was accepted by the club, following an investigation from the SFA.

In the 2013–14 season Pawlett retained his first team place, mostly playing as more of an attacking midfielder. He would score five league goals, against Partick Thistle, St Mirren, St Johnstone, Inverness Caledonian Thistle and Dundee United during the season. His good performances earned a contract extension, which will keep him at Aberdeen until 2017. In the second half of the season, Pawlett would play a vital role for the club, as he scored one and then set one up, in a 4–0 win over St Johnstone, to send the club to the Scottish League Cup final for the first time in fourteen years. Then, in the fifth round of the Scottish Cup, Pawlett scored the winning goal in a 2–1 win over holders Celtic, the first time Aberdeen had beaten Celtic since 2008.

In 2014, he was the subject of a campaign by Aberdeen fans to get The Human League song 'Don't You Want Me' to Number One in the charts following the success of their version singing 'Peter Pawlett baby'.

Pawlett did not play regularly for Aberdeen in the following seasons, as Niall McGinn and Jonny Hayes were the first choice wingers.

Milton Keynes Dons
On 9 March 2017, English League One side Milton Keynes Dons announced that Pawlett had signed a pre-contract deal to join the club at the end of the 2016–17 season.

Pawlett made his first appearance for his new club on 5 August 2017 in a 0–1 home defeat to Wigan Athletic, coming on as a 63rd-minute substitute for Ryan Seager. On 2 December 2017, Pawlett scored his first goal for the club in a 4–1 FA Cup second round home win over Maidstone United.

Dundee United
On 31 January 2019, Pawlett joined Scottish Championship club Dundee United for an undisclosed fee. Two days later, he scored the winning goal in a 2–1 win for United against Greenock Morton.

International career
Born in Hull, Pawlett was initially only eligible for England. However following the introduction of the Home nations agreement Pawlett became eligible to play for Scotland. As Pawlett was educated in Banchory for eight years, he met the requirements of the Home Nations Agreement which allow players who have been educated for five years or more under the age of 18 in a Home Nation to represent that country. Pawlett was selected for the Scotland under-19 team in November 2009 and spoke out about his delight at having switched nationality.

On 16 May 2014, Pawlett was called into the senior Scotland squad for the first time, for the friendly against Nigeria.

Career statistics

Honours
Aberdeen
Scottish League Cup: 2013–14

Dundee United
Scottish Championship: 2019–20

Individual
Scottish Premier League Young Player of the Month: November 2009
PFA Scotland Team of the Year: 2013–14 Premiership

References

External links

Living people
1991 births
Footballers from Kingston upon Hull
Scottish footballers
Association football midfielders
Aberdeen F.C. players
St Johnstone F.C. players
Scottish Premier League players
People educated at Banchory Academy
Scotland under-21 international footballers
Scotland youth international footballers
Scottish Professional Football League players
Milton Keynes Dons F.C. players
Dundee United F.C. players
Anglo-Scots
Footballers from Aberdeenshire